The England national amateur football team was the amateur representative team for England at football. It was formed in 1901, due to the growth of the professional game which meant that amateur players could no longer easily find places in the main England national team.

It was the most successful team in the British Amateur Championship, winning on 16 occasions (5 joint). The England amateur team was disbanded by The Football Association in 1974.

First match and unbeaten run

Its first international match was against Germany on 21 September 1901, a 12–0 win at White Hart Lane, London, with R. E. Foster scoring 6 (One source gives 7). It was to be another five years before an official England amateur team was founded. The next match was away against France on 1 November 1906 and resulted in a 15–0 win for England, with Stanley Harris netting seven goals and Vivian Woodward four. The team played many internationals against the full representative sides of Europe, which were usually a mixture of amateur and professional players. The strength of the English amateur team meant they were still able to beat many of these sides and in fact they were unbeaten in 20 matches from 1906 to 1910. Whilst these England amateur matches are not considered full senior internationals by The Football Association, they are deemed to be by their opponents. As such, the England amateur side delivered the biggest defeats on several European nations; the Netherlands in 1907, Germany & Belgium in 1909, and Sweden & Hungary in 1912 (as Great Britain), beating them 12–2, 9–0, 11–2, 12–2 and 7–0 respectively.

England amateurs and Great Britain Olympics team

 There is a difference of opinion as to whether the England amateur team was effectively the Great Britain Olympic football team at the 1908 and 1912 Olympic football tournaments. The FA's website considers the gold medals in these tournaments a win for the England amateur side rather than a British team, whilst in Bryon Butler's book it is shown that the winners' certificate names England. Conversely, Mark Chapman's England's Amateurs site states that the 1908 and 1912 teams were Great Britain and points to the fact that photographic evidence shows the team playing with the Union flag on their shirts. It can be stated that both arguments are true, as it was the case for the 1956 Olympic tournament where the team played as Great Britain but the team was organised by the FA and consisted solely of amateur Englishmen as the other home nations withdrew their support.

Demise and successors
The England amateur team was disbanded in 1974 when the Football Association abolished the distinction between amateurs and professionals, simply calling them "players". A semi-professional representative team, made up of players from the National League System, now plays in its place.

Top goalscorers

The list below only includes those matches prior to World War I (1906–1914).

Willie Jordan has scored 6 goals, while the likes of William Stapley, Arthur Bell, Syd Owen and‎ Frederick Chapman settled at five.

Results

See also 
 Great Britain men's Olympic football team
 United Kingdom national football team
 England national football C team
 England national football team

Notes

References 

Amateur
England
European Olympic national association football teams
Football at the 1908 Summer Olympics
Football at the 1912 Summer Olympics
Former national association football teams in Europe
Great Britain Olympic football team
Olympic gold medallists for Great Britain
Organizations disestablished in 1974
Amateur sport in the United Kingdom
1974 disestablishments in England